Oliva rufula is a species of sea snail, a marine gastropod mollusk in the family Olividae, the olives.

Description
The length of the shell varies between 25 mm and 40 mm

Distribution
This marine species occurs off the Philippines, the Solomon Islands and off Ambon, Indoensia.

References

 Liu, J.Y. [Ruiyu] (ed.). (2008). Checklist of marine biota of China seas. China Science Press. 1267 pp
 Vervaet F.L.J. (2018). The living Olividae species as described by Pierre-Louis Duclos. Vita Malacologica. 17: 1-111

External links
 MNHN, Paris: syntype

rufula
Gastropods described in 1840